Consort Yuan may refer to:

Imperial consorts with the surname Yuan
Yuan Qigui (405–440), wife of Liu Yilong (Emperor Wen of Liu Song)
Empress Yuan (Northern Qi) (died after 580), wife of Gao Yan (Emperor Xiaozhao of Northern Qi)
Yuan Humo (died 616), wife of Yuwen Jue (Emperor Xiaomin of Northern Zhou)
Yuan Leshang (born 565), concubine of Yuwen Yun (Emperor Xuan of Northern Zhou)
Consort Yuan (Ma Yin) (died 933?), concubine of Ma Yin, ruler of Ma Chu

Imperial consorts with the title Consort Yuan
Consort Yuan (Hong Taiji) (1593–1612), concubine of Hong Taiji, ruler of Later Jin
Jia Yuanchun, fictional character from Dream of the Red Chamber